L'Association Football Club de Compiègne or AFC Compiègne is a French football club based in the commune of Compiègne.

As of the 2022–23 season, they play in Championnat National 3, the fifth tier of French football. Their kit colours are yellow and blue. They play their home matches at the Stade Paul Cosyns in Compiègne.

History
The club was founded in 1993 after two former clubs, Stade Compiègnois and AS Compiègne Clos des Roses, merged to make one team in the town. From their first season in 1993–1994 season they played in the DH, the sixth tier of French football until the 2002–2003 season when they gained promotion to the Championnat de France Amateurs 2, where they stayed for two seasons until they again won promotion to the Championnat de France Amateurs, where they still play now.

Current squad

Colours
Their kit colours are yellow and blue. The current kit manufacturer is Nike. The home kit is a yellow shirt and shorts with blue navy socks, and the away kit is a blue navy shirt with white arms, and blue navy shorts and socks

Honours
 Division 4 Group A: 1984
 DH Picardie Group: 1980, 2003
 DH Nord-Est: 1963
 Coupe de Picardie: 2003
 Coupe de l'Oise: 2003, 2010

References

External links
 

Football clubs in France
Association football clubs established in 1993
1993 establishments in France
Compiègne
Sport in Oise
Football clubs in Hauts-de-France